Michel Charréard (born 10 July 1959) is a French former professional racing cyclist. He rode in the 1984 Tour de France.

References

External links
 

1959 births
Living people
French male cyclists
Sportspeople from Vienne, Isère
Cyclists from Auvergne-Rhône-Alpes